Kevin James Towns (born 6 September 1948 in Masterton) is a former field hockey player from New Zealand, who became a hockey coach after his active career. He led New Zealand Hockey Team to the silver medal at the 2002 Commonwealth Games in Manchester.

References
 New Zealand Commonwealth Games

1948 births
Living people
New Zealand field hockey coaches
New Zealand male field hockey players
Sportspeople from Masterton
New Zealand Olympic coaches